The Cinque Ports Division, Royal Artillery was an administrative grouping of garrison units of the Royal Artillery, Artillery Militia and Artillery Volunteers within the British Army's South Eastern District from 1882 to 1889.

Organisation
Under General Order 72 of 4 April 1882 the Royal Artillery (RA) broke up its existing administrative brigades of garrison artillery (7th–11th Brigades, RA) and assigned the individual batteries to 11 new territorial divisions. These divisions were purely administrative and recruiting organisations, not field formations. Most were formed within the existing military districts into which the United Kingdom was divided, and for the first time associated the part-time Artillery Militia with the regulars. Shortly afterwards the Artillery Volunteers were also added to the territorial divisions. The Regular Army batteries were grouped into one brigade, usually of nine sequentially-numbered batteries and a depot battery. For these units the divisions represented recruiting districts – batteries could be serving anywhere in the British Empire and their only connection to brigade headquarters (HQ) was for the supply of drafts and recruits. The artillery militia units (sometimes referred to as regiments) already comprised a number of batteries, and were redesignated as brigades, losing their county titles in the process. The artillery volunteers, which had previously consisted of numerous independent Artillery Volunteer Corps (AVC) of various sizes, sometimes grouped into administrative brigades, had been consolidated into larger AVCs in 1881, which were now affiliated to the appropriate territorial division.

Composition
Cinque Ports Division, RA, listed as fourth in order of precedence, was organised within the Cinque Ports coastal area of South Eastern District with the following composition:
 Headquarters (HQ) at Dover
1st Brigade
 HQ at Dover
 1st Bty at Guernsey – formerly 13th Bty, 11th Bde
 2nd (Mountain) Bty at Alderney – formerly 12th Bty, 11th Bde
 3rd Bty at Dover – formerly 10th Bty, 8th Bde
 4th Bty at Dover – formerly 18th Bty, 7th Bde
 5th Bty at Jamaica – formerly 17th Bty, 7th Bde
 6th Bty at Barbados– formerly 6th Bty, 9th Bde
 7th Bty at Quetta – formerly 6th Bty, 10th Bde
 8th Bty at Bombay – formerly 7th Bty, 10th Bde
 9th (Mountain) Bty at Khandala – formerly 5th Bty, 8th Bde
 Depot Bty – formerly Depot Bty, 9th Bde 
 2nd Brigade at Dover – formerly Kent Militia Artillery (6 btys)
 3rd Brigade at Lewes – formerly Royal Sussex Militia Artillery (5 btys)
 1st Sussex Artillery Volunteers at Brighton
 2nd Sussex Artillery Volunteers at Eastbourne – independent from 1st Sussex 1886
 1st Kent Artillery Volunteers at Gravesend
 1st Cinque Ports Artillery Volunteers at Dover

Under General Order 77 of June 1887 the AVCs were redesignated within the CP Division: 
 1st Volunteer (Sussex) Brigade
 2nd Volunteer (Sussex) Brigade
 3rd Volunteer (Kent) Brigade
 4th Volunteer (Cinque Ports) Brigade

Disbandment
In 1889 the garrison artillery was reorganised again into three large divisions of garrison artillery (Eastern, Southern and Western) and one of mountain artillery. The militia and volunteer units formerly in CP Division were reassigned to the Eastern Division while the regular batteries were distributed across all four divisions and completely renumbered.

See also
 Royal Garrison Artillery
 List of Royal Artillery Divisions 1882–1902
 Eastern Division, Royal Artillery
 Southern Division, Royal Artillery
 Western Division, Royal Artillery
 Mountain Division, Royal Artillery

Footnotes

Notes

References
 J.B.M. Frederick, Lineage Book of British Land Forces 1660–1978, Vol II, Wakefield: Microform Academic, 1984, ISBN 1-85117-009-X.
 Lt-Gen H.G. Hart, The New Annual Army List, Militia List, Yeomanry Cavalry List and Indian Civil Service List for 1884, London: John Murray, 1883.
 Lt-Gen H.G. Hart, The New Annual Army List, Militia List, Yeomanry Cavalry List and Indian Civil Service List for 1890, London: John Murray, 1889.
 Lt-Col M.E.S. Lawes, Battery Records of the Royal Artillery, 1859–1877, Woolwich: Royal Artillery Institution, 1970.
 Norman E.H. Litchfield, The Militia Artillery 1852–1909 (Their Lineage, Uniforms and Badges), Nottingham: Sherwood Press, 1987, ISBN 0-9508205-1-2.
 Norman Litchfield & Ray Westlake, The Volunteer Artillery 1859–1908 (Their Lineage, Uniforms and Badges), Nottingham: Sherwood Press, 1982, ISBN 0-9508205-0-4.
 Col K. W. Maurice-Jones, The History of Coast Artillery in the British Army, London: Royal Artillery Institution, 1959/Uckfield: Naval & Military Press, 2005, ISBN 978-1-845740-31-3.
 War Office, Monthly Army List, London: HM Stationery Office, 1882–89.

Royal Artillery divisions
Military units and formations in Dover
Military units and formations in the Cinque Ports
Military units and formations established in 1882
Military units and formations disestablished in 1889